The men's shot put event at the 1976 Summer Olympics in Montreal, Quebec, Canada, had an entry list of 23 competitors from 17 nations, with two qualifying groups (23 putters) before the final (12) took place on Saturday July 24, 1976. The maximum number of athletes per nation had been set at 3 since the 1930 Olympic Congress. The top twelve and ties, and all those reaching 19.40 metres advanced to the final. The qualifying round was held on Friday 23, 1976.

The first round leader was Aleksandr Baryshnikov with a 20.53. Al Feuerbach increased that by 2 cm with a 20.55 in the second round, with Udo Beyer moving into bronze medal position with a 20.50. Baryshnikov upped the ante to 21.00 in the third round and that is the way the leader board stayed until the fifth round. Beyer moved into gold medal position with a 21.05. A few throws later Yevgeny Mironov threw 21.03 and leaped from 6th place to the silver medal.

Beyer's gold medal was the first for East Germany in the men's shot put, and the first gold medal for any German shot putter since 1936. Mironov and Baryshnikov took the Soviet Union's first men's shot put medals since 1968, with Mironov's silver the best-yet result for the nation. The United States was kept off the podium in the event for only the second time (the first was in 1936). East Germany became only the second nation to reach the podium in consecutive Games.

Background

This was the 18th appearance of the event, which is one of 12 athletics events to have been held at every Summer Olympics. Returning finalists from the 1972 Games were two-time silver medalist George Woods and fifth-place finisher Al Feuerbach of the United States, fourth-place finisher Hans-Peter Gies and eleventh-place finisher Heinz-Joachim Rothenburg of East Germany, tenth-place finisher Jaroslav Brabec of Czechoslovakia, twelfth-place finisher Yves Brouzet of France, thirteenth-place finisher Ralf Reichenbach of West Germany, and seventeenth-place finisher Bruce Pirnie of Canada. The third member of the 1972 American team, Brian Oldfield, had turned professional since the Munich Games; his 22.86 metres world record was not ratified by the amateur federation. The leading amateur was Aleksandr Baryshnikov of the Soviet Union, at 22.00 metres, a favorite in Montreal.

Kuwait made its debut in the men's shot put. The United States appeared for the 18th time, the only nation to have competed in all Olympic shot put competitions to date.

Competition format

The competition used the two-round format introduced in 1936, with the qualifying round completely separate from the divided final. In qualifying, each athlete received three attempts; those recording a mark of at least 19.40 metres advanced to the final. If fewer than 12 athletes achieved that distance, the top 12 would advance. The results of the qualifying round were then ignored. Finalists received three throws each, with the top eight competitors receiving an additional three attempts. The best distance among those six throws counted.

Records

For the second time in three Games, the new Olympic record was a qualifying round throw. Aleksandr Baryshnikov broke the Olympic record with a put of 21.32 metres in the qualifying round. Nobody was able to match that mark in the final, with Udo Beyer's gold-winning put only reaching 21.05 metres.

Schedule

All times are Eastern Daylight Time (UTC-4)

Results

Qualifying

Final

References

External links
  Results

T
Shot put at the Olympics
Men's events at the 1976 Summer Olympics